Hulodes ischnesthes is a species of moth of the family Erebidae. It is found in Indonesia (Buru) and New Guinea.

References

Moths described in 1932
Hulodes
Moths of Indonesia
Moths of New Guinea